The bombing of Kermanshah's park shelter (in Persian: بمباران پناهگاه پارک کرمانشاه) was carried out by the army of Ba'athist Iraq against the shelter of "Shirin park of Kermanshah", on 16 March 1988.

At the mentioned bombing, Iraq also bombed the other localities of the city as well as the shelter of Shirin Park by air-to-ground missile; but bombing "Shirin Park Shelter" is considered as the most critical locality. As a result of the mentioned attack(s), 76 persons --mostly women/children-- who were in the shelter, were killed and more than 200 persons were injured.

There is a book by the name of "Panahgah-e Bi-Panah" (Shelterless Shelter) (Persian: پناهگاه بی پناه), written by Mahnaz Fattahi; which has highlighted the survivors memories of the Kermanshah's Shirin park shelter bombing.

See also

 Iran Iraq war
 Kalhor Kurds (tribes)
 Kermanshah Province

References 

Iran–Iraq War
1988 in Iran
Battles involving Iraq
Kermanshah
March 1988 events in Asia